The 12251 / 12252 Wainganga Superfast Express is a Superfast train service of Indian Railways that runs twice a week between the southern city of Bangalore and mining city of Korba in Chhattisgarh state. 12251 Wainganga SF Express departs from Bangalore's Yesvantpur railway station on Tuesdays and Fridays while on return journey 12252 Wainganga Express departs from Korba on Thursdays and Sundays. Wainganga Express runs through the states of Karnataka, Andhra Pradesh, Telangana, Maharashtra and Chhattisgarh to cover a distance of 1614 km in 28 hours and 50 minutes at an average speed of 59 km/hr. The train is named after Wainganga River.

Route & Halts
The train runs from Yesvantpur Junction via 
, 
 , 
 , 
 , 
, 
, 
, 
, 
, 
,
, 
, 
, 
, 
, 
, 
,
.

Traction
A Gooty WDP-4D locomotive from Gooty to Kacheguda as there is no complete electrification in between Mahabubnagar to Kacheguda. Once the train arrived kacheguda The diesel loco WDP-4D will be detached & it runs with the old locomotive Krishnarajapuram WAP-7 & vice versa in the return journey

YPR TO KRBA & KRBA TO YPR [KJM=WAP-7]
GOOTY TO KCG & KCG TO GOOTY [GY=WDP-4D]

External links
Complete time table

Transport in Bangalore
Transport in Korba, Chhattisgarh
Express trains in India
Rail transport in Karnataka
Rail transport in Chhattisgarh
Rail transport in Andhra Pradesh
Rail transport in Telangana
Rail transport in Maharashtra
Named passenger trains of India